The Golden Disc (also known as The In-Between Age) is a 1958 British pop musical film. It features pop singer Terry Dene as himself in a story in which he tops the best-seller charts, whereas in his real life he never made the top ten. The film was directed by Don Sharp, who was married to the leading lady  Mary Steele.

It was re-released on DVD by Renown Pictures Ltd in 2010.

Plot
A young man and woman help her aunt open a trendy coffee bar and they discover a singing star.

Cast 
 Lee Patterson as Harry Blair
 Mary Steele as Joan Farmer
 Terry Dene as himself
 Linda Gray as Aunt Sarah
 Ronald Adam as Mr. Dryden
 Peter Dyneley as Mr. Washington
 David Jacobs as himself
 Richard Turner as Morose Man
 Marianne Stone as Dryden's Secretary
 Olive Milbourn as Mrs Simpson
 Redmond Phillips as 1st Recording Engineer
 Dennis Lotis as himself
 Nancy Whiskey as herself
 Hobeaux as Themselves
 Murray Campbell as himself
 Sheila Buxton as herself
 Phil Seamen Jazz Group as Themselves
 Sonny Stewart & his Skiffle Kings as Themselves
 Terry Kennedy Group as Themselves

Production
The film was shot at Walton Studios. It was a vehicle for Terry Dene who had three top twenty hits in Britain.

The film was one of several British pop films set around coffee bars, others including The Tommy Steele Story, Serious Charge, Beat Girl and Expresso Bongo. Director Don Sharp said it was made at a time when "everybody was making a musical". His wife Mary played the female lead.

Filming started on 23 September 1957. Jack Phillips of Butchers Film Productions, who made the film, claimed the film was "not an imitation of The Tommy Steele Story or anything like this" even though it was a musical vehicle for a pop star.

Songs
 ‘I’m Gonna Wrap You Up’ (by Ray Mack, Philip Green) performed by Dennis Lotis
 ‘Before We Say Goodnight’ (by Norman Newell, Philip Green) performed by Mary Steele
 ‘Dynamo’ (by Tommy Connor) performed by Les Hobeaux Skiffle Group  
 ‘C’min and be Loved’ (by Len Paverman) performed by Terry Dene
 ‘Charm’ (by Ray Mack, Philip Green) performed by Terry Dene
 ‘The In-between Age’ (by Ray Mack, Philip Green) performed by Sheila Buxton
 ‘Let Me Lie’ (by Sonny & Stewart) performed by Sonny Stewart and his Skiffle Kings
 ‘Candy Floss’ (by Len Paverman) performed by Terry Dene
 ‘Lower Deck’ (by Phil Seamon) performed by Phil Seamon Jazz Group
 ‘Balmoral Melody’ (by Philip Green) performed by Murray Campbell
 ‘Johnny O’ (by Len Praverman) performed by Nancy Whiskey and Sonny Stewart and his Skiffle Kings 
‘The Golden Age’ (by Michael Robbins, Richard Dix) performed by Terry Dene.

Reception
The film was not a success at the box office, a factor which was thought to have contributed to Dene showing symptoms of unstable behaviour.

References

External links
 
 
 
Review at Variety
The Golden Disco at Letterbox DVD

1958 films
British musical films
1958 musical films
1950s English-language films
1950s British films